"The New Year" is a song recorded by American rock band Death Cab for Cutie. The song was released in February 2004 as the second single from the group's fourth studio album Transatlanticism (2003).

Background
Gibbard crafted the song's fictional protagonist as a mix of several different women he had met: "This song is about a person who came to me one day and said she wanted to be written about. So it's not really my story as much as it is hers." Lyrically, the song revolves around a melancholic New Years' party. Gibbard also has noted the song originated as more a folk song, but was expanded upon.

Reception
The band's international distribution was split through several different labels, a common experience for indie groups. In the Netherlands, it was distributed by Munich Records. The 7" single was disitributed in the United Kingdom through the label Fierce Panda. The single charted for one week on the UK Singles Chart, reaching number 86 on February 28, 2004.

Charts

References

Songs about parties
2004 singles
2003 songs
Death Cab for Cutie songs
Songs written by Jason McGerr
Songs written by Chris Walla
Songs written by Nick Harmer
Songs written by Ben Gibbard